James Leslie Binks (born 1951) is a Northern Irish heavy metal drummer. He was the drummer for Judas Priest from 1977 to 1979.

History
Previously working for Eric Burdon, Binks was a drummer on Roger Glover's album The Butterfly Ball and the Grasshopper's Feast (1974). The album project began as a soundtrack for an animated film based on a well-known English children's book, but a promo for the film never gained any interest, so the project was scrapped. Glover went on to release the soundtrack as a "Roger Glover and Friends" title. One of the featured vocalists, Eddie Hardin, later released his own albums, the first of which was Eddie Hardin's Wizard's Convention (1976), which again included Binks on drums.

Binks played for the pop band Fancy who had two U.S. hits in 1974 with a cover of "Wild Thing", and "Touch Me".

Through his connection to Roger Glover who had just wrapped up production of their album Sin After Sin, Binks joined the up-and-coming heavy metal act Judas Priest in March 1977 for their world tour – their first on American soil. Binks remained with the band for two and a half years, until July 1979, recording the studio albums Stained Class and  Killing Machine and the live album Unleashed in the East. While with Judas Priest, he received a writing credit for the song "Beyond the Realms of Death" from the album Stained Class. Binks made a home demo of the track with friend Steve Mann of the Michael Schenker Group helping on guitar, and at a band rehearsal he picked up a guitar to show them the song. The band loved the song and vocalist Rob Halford then crafted the song's lyrics and title.

Binks left the band just before the start of the North American leg of the "Killing Machine" (Hell Bent for Leather) tour. Binks said in 2017 that he left because he felt he was essentially hired as a "freelance session drummer" by the band and was never made an official member. He felt insulted when the band's then-manager Mike Dolan suggested that he "waive his fees" (i.e. not get paid for his performance) on the live album Unleashed in the East, a RIAA-certified platinum seller.

In 1979, Binks joined Charlie Whitney and Axis Point and remained active in the British hard rock/heavy metal underground. In 1981, he was a member of Lionheart which featured Dennis Stratton (ex-Iron Maiden) on guitar and Jess Cox (ex-Tygers of Pan Tang) on vocals, though this was only a brief stint. Also in 1981, Binks played on the album Finardi by Italian rock singer Eugenio Finardi.

Binks toured with the bands Lionheart (1981) and Tytan (1982–1983) soon after their first single release.

Since then, Binks has appeared in a classic rock cover band around South London called The Shakers, with Dave Bunce, guitarist Pete Friesen (formerly with Jeff Beck and with Alice Cooper), and vocalist/guitarist Tom Lundy (of The Poor Mouth). Rounding out the band was bassist Phil Rynhart, co-founder member of The Poor Mouth. Binks and Pete Friesen have also done time in Metalworks, along with ex-Iron Maiden guitarist Tony Parsons, playing covers of Judas Priest, Iron Maiden, and other legendary metal bands around London.

In 2013, he joined the band Raw Glory, which also featured singer Paul Manzi (of Arena).

In 2015, Binks played live around London in Broken Bones with ex-Bad II The Bone members Ed Hudson and Paul Smith, and in original prog-folk-rock band Kindred Spirit with whom he recorded the album Phoenix Rising. 

During 2017 and 2018, he performed classic Judas Priest songs live with a new band called Les Binks' Priesthood. He then intended to join the band KK's Priest after a one-time show in late 2019 playing Judas Priest songs at KK's Steelmill, along with other former Judas Priest members K. K. Downing (guitar) and Tim "Ripper" Owens (vocals). Other participants included David Ellefson (bass) of Megadeth and A.J. Mills (guitar) of the UK band Hostile. However, Binks reportedly suffered a fractured wrist prior to the recording of KK's Priest's first album in 2020, so he was replaced by Sean Elg (The Three Tremors).

In 2022, Binks was inducted into the Rock and Roll Hall of Fame as a member of Judas Priest via the Award for Musical Excellence. On 14 October, K. K. Downing confirmed that he and Binks would be joining Judas Priest for a performance at the induction ceremony.

Binks played a 3 song set with Judas Priest at their Rock and Roll hall of fame induction on 5 November 2022, marking his first appearance with the band in 43 years.

References

External links
 

Living people
Drummers from Northern Ireland
British heavy metal drummers
Judas Priest members
People from Portadown
1951 births